Cristi-Ilie Pîrghie (born 20 July 1992) is a Romanian rower. He competed in the men's coxless pair event at the 2016 Summer Olympics.

References

External links 
 
 
 

1992 births
Living people
Romanian male rowers
Olympic rowers of Romania
Rowers at the 2012 Summer Olympics
Rowers at the 2016 Summer Olympics
Sportspeople from Timișoara